Malabica tatai is a species of beetles in the family Monotomidae, the only species in the genus Malabica.

References

Monotomidae
Monotypic Cucujoidea genera